Dwight Loftis (born February 4, 1943) is an American politician from South Carolina. A member of the South Carolina Senate since 2019, he previously represented district 19 in the South Carolina House of Representatives for 23 years from 1996 to 2019. He is a member of the Republican party.

Loftis became the Republican nominee for South Carolina Senate district 6 on January 22, 2019, by beating opponents Amy Ryberg Doyle and Jeffery Stringer.

He won his state senate district 6 election with 56 percent of the votes against Democrat Tina Belge who received 44 percent of the votes in her first run for elected office.

Loftis opposes to gay marriage and strongly supports marriage as defined between a man and woman.

He voted to keep the Confederate Flag flying above the South Carolina Statehouse.

References

External links

|-

Living people
1943 births
People from Greenville County, South Carolina
Republican Party members of the South Carolina House of Representatives
21st-century American politicians